Road safety in Europe encompasses transportation safety among road users in Europe, including automobile accidents, pedestrian or cycling accidents, motor-coach accidents, and other incidents occurring within the European Union or within the European region of the World Health Organization (49 countries). Road traffic safety refers to the methods and measures used to prevent road users from being killed or seriously injured.

In 2016, according to the World Health Organisation, road accidents were the eighth-biggest cause of death in the world; deadlier than both diarrhoeal diseases and tuberculosis. Not only is it important to consider road fatalities, but for every fatality on Europe's roads, it is estimated that 4 people will become permanently disabled, 10 will suffer brain or spinal cord damage, 10 people will be seriously injured and 40 will have sustained minor injuries. On top of this, road accidents incur a large economic impact. In Europe alone, it is estimated that road accidents are a cost to society by a measure of €130 billion annually. Road accidents and incidents happen for a number of reasons. The main cause of an accident is speed, this is followed by other issues such as driving whilst under the influence of drink or drugs, being distracted at the wheel by mobile devices, in-car radios or personal navigation devices. These risk factors listed here are but a few reasons for road collisions to occur and they demonstrate the myriad of complex factors that are at play for road-safety policy makers.

Trends and targets 

The European Union (EU) has the safest roads in the world; in which 49 people per million inhabitants died in a road collision in 2018. In the year 2000 over 50,000 people in Europe lost their lives on the roads, by 2009 this number had been reduced to over 35,000; and by 2018 the figure has been reduced further to 25,100, whilst in the same year the number of serious injuries incurred as a result of road collisions was 135,000 people.

The European Commission (EC) has laid out a plan entitled Vision Zero which endeavours to reduce the incidence of road induced fatalities to a rate of zero by the year 2050. In order to be able to achieve their long-term ambition of zero deaths on Europe's roads, the Commission implemented a road safety strategy, The Road Safety Programme, in which they aimed to halve the number of fatalities caused by road accidents and incidents between 2011 and 2020. As of 2018, European Union member states are far from this target, since there has only been a 20% reduction in road fatalities, which makes the target of a 50% reduction by 2020 now seem implausible. 

The Commissioner of Transport of the EU considers road safety as a key European success story.

Various geographical safety organizations

World Health Organization
The World Health Organization issued a European Status Report on road safety.

Ninety per cent of WHO countries have a safety agency operating with their respective transport ministries, except in CIS countries where the topic falls under the interior minister.

From an EU perspective
Road safety policy making in the EU falls jointly on the European institutions and member states; and it is the European Commission (EC) which has a particularly important role in overseeing road safety policy across the Union. This is because it has oversight over product standards and regulations, as well as certain aspects of infrastructure development and management. Road safety is based upon the EU principle of subsidiarity: national and local authorities are responsible for most decisions, including enforcement and awareness-raising, while the EU operates a general framework for improved road safety via legislation and recommendations e.g. introducing minimum safety requirements for the Trans-European Transport Networks, and technical requirements for the transport of dangerous goods.

The EU publishes various legal texts regarding road safety.

European Road Safety NGOs 
The European Transport Safety Council is an NGO based in Brussels. It aims to reduce the numbers of deaths and injuries in transport in Europe. The Council reported an increase in fatalities in most European countries in 2015.

Definitions

Killed definition

The 1968 Vienna Convention on Road Traffic defines a fatal road accident as an accident in which a person died of their injuries at the scene or within thirty days. This definition has been adopted across most EU countries.

Some countries have applied this definition retrospectively where possible. For instance, until 2004 France counted its killed at six days, but in an effort to enable comparison with neighbor countries a multiplicative coefficient  was used up to 2004 and  since 2005 to convert the killed at six days into killed at thirty days, before France adopted the international definition in 2005.

Injuries
Each year road crashes generate about 120,000 fatalities and 2.4 million injuries in the European region of the World Health Organization. Road traffic injuries are the leading cause of death among adolescents and young adults.

In 2015, the European Commission published a figure for the number of people seriously injured on Europe's roads: 135,000 people in 2014. To obtain this figure all countries of the EU needed to align on a common standardized medical definition of what constitutes a serious road injury.

In Europe, for every person killed in traffic crashes, many more suffer serious injuries with life-changing consequences.

Serious injuries are more costly to society because of the long-term rehabilitation and healthcare needed. Vulnerable road users, such as pedestrians, cyclists, motorcyclists or elderly road users, are especially concerned.

Between 2010 and 2018, between 206 and 222 thousands serious injured were counted yearly for 23 EU members

Other issues

The level of transport-related air pollution is also a major public health concern in most countries of Europe.

Main road casualties indicators

Many differences between countries are linked to demography, development level and population density. According to Siem Oppe of the SWOW  a learning behavior appears in the changes in the level of fatalities over time:
In the poorest countries, there are few trips and less public transport. Motorized road traffic is low and the rate of fatalities by million inhabitants is very low (fewer than 30).
Development of car use leads to a sharp increase in traffic and consequently increases accident numbers, and the ratio killed per million inhabitants in less poor countries passes 200.
On the other hand, the richest countries experience a lot of congestion and have more developed transport and road safety policies. Drivers' behaviour is more cautious, and the ratio killed falls to less than 80 killed per million inhabitants.

†a Data only available for 2017

†b Data not available for "Other Roads" Category in source

†c Data not available for "Other Roads" Category in source

†d Data only available for 2016

†e Data for MAIS3+ certification

Nationals means do not show local variations, so in 2015, NUTS regions with the lower fatality ratio per million inhabitants, are Stockholm (6), Vienna (7), Hamburg and Oslo (11), Berlin (14) and East Sweden (15). The same year, other regions have a worst fatality ratio such as the Luxembourg province of Belgium (210) and Kastamonu in Turkey (192).

UK position

Mortality in UK is rather reduced compared with the EU.

Les moyennes nationales ne reflètent pas les variations locales, ainsi en 2015, les régions NUTS ayant la mortalité routière la plus faible, par million d'habitants, sont Stokholm (6), Viennes (7), Hambourg et Oslo (11), Berlin (14) et Ostra Verige (15). La même année, les régions les plus meurtrières sont la province de Luxembourg en Belgique (210) et Kastamonu en Turquie (192).

The "per 10 billion pkm" indicator is based on an estimated value due to missing vkm indicator.
In 2016, the indicator range from 23 for Sweden to 192 for Romania, with a 52 value for 28-EU. Germany, France, UK and Italy ranks 33, 46, 28, and 44, respectively.

Transportation mode effect

Car drivers and their passengers formed the greatest proportion of road fatalities in 2013 at 45%, followed by pedestrians at 22%. These vary considerably between nations with high levels of fatalities for motorcycles where their use is more common, linked to the climate of Mediterranean countries.

In the world and within the European Union (28 members), mortality depends upon modal transportation:

Transport safety (modal comparison)

Sources :
 pdf: Période 1999 dans l'Union européenne, European Transport Safety Council
 pdf: Période 2001/2002, European Transport Safety Council

Rating roads for safety
Since 1999 the EuroRAP initiative has been assessing major roads in Europe with a road protection score. This results in a star rating for roads based on how well its design would protect car occupants from being severely injured or killed if a head-on, run-off, or intersection accident occurs, with four stars representing a road with the best survivability features. The scheme states it has highlighted thousands of road sections across Europe where road users are routinely maimed and killed for want of safety features, sometimes for little more than the cost of safety fencing or the paint required to improve road markings.

There are plans to extend the measurements to rate the probability of an accident for the road. These ratings are being used to inform planning and authorities' targets. For example, in Britain two thirds of all road deaths in Britain happen on rural roads, which score badly when compared with the high-quality motorway network; single carriageways claim 80% of rural deaths and serious injuries, while 40% of rural car occupant casualties are in cars that hit roadside objects, such as trees. Improvements in driver training and safety features for rural roads are hoped to reduce this statistic.

The number of designated traffic officers in the UK fell from 15 to 20% of police force strength in 1966 to seven per cent of force strength in 1998, and between 1999 and 2004 by 21%. It is an item of debate whether the reduction in traffic accidents per 100 million miles driven over this time has been due to robotic enforcement.

Law

EU law
The European Union has some legal texts regarding Driving License, Enforcement in the field of road safety, Alcohol, Drugs and Medicine, Professional Drivers – Training, Professional Drivers – Working Conditions, Professional Drivers – Tachograph, Professional Drivers – Check of the working Conditions, Third Countries Driver Attestation, Vehicles – type approval, Vehicle – Registration, Vehicle – Technical Control, Vehicle – Front Protection of Vulnerable Users, Vehicle – Safety Belts and other Restraints Systems of Vulnerable Users, Vehicle – Tyres, Vehicle – Daytime Running Lights, Vehicle – Blind Spot Mirrors, Vehicle – Conspicuity, Vehicle – Speed limitation Devices, Vehicle – Weights and Dimensions, Transport of Dangerous Goods – Weights and Dimensions, Road Infrastructure, Emergency Calls, Accident Data Collection, and Unit of Measurement.

Some of those texts are documented in Wikipedia, such as Directive 80/1269/EEC, European driving license, European emission standards, and End of Life Vehicles Directive.

EU Directive 2008/96/EC on Road Infrastructure Safety Management (RISM) provides for the introduction of road safety impact assessments (RSIA) in the process of designing a new road or major road layout change. As defined by the European Directive, RSIA is "a strategic comparative analysis of the impact of a new road or a substantial modification to the existing network on the safety performance of the road network". The RISM directive was transposed into Irish law under SI 472 of 2011.

Road safety within tunnels on the Trans-European Road Network is specifically covered within a separate directive.

In 2018 the European Commission presented a proposal to amend the EU RISM directive with a view to reducing road fatalities and serious injuries on EU road networks, by improving the safety performance of road infrastructure. The amendment was adopted in November 2019.

National (local) laws
European countries usually have improvable laws regarding speed control, drunk driving, helmets, seat belts and child car restraints. Most countries have laws regarding one or another concern, but less than a third of countries have laws and control for each of them.

Drink driving limits 

Source: https://etsc.eu/blood-alcohol-content-bac-drink-driving-limits-across-europe

Safety awards 

In 2018, Ireland wins the PIN award 2019, is the best performer of the European Union for traffic safety, with 30 deaths per million inhabitants. not counting the withdrawing United Kingdom.
It is also the second member of the EU for deaths per billion vehicle-km, with a rate of 3.5, not as good as the rate 3.4 for Sweden, not counting the withdrawing United Kingdom.

Ireland actions to improve safety included fighting against drunk driving, drunk pedestrian, drunk motorcyclist, and speeding motorcyclists.

Local specificities

EU-27 differences
In the European Union differences exist from country to country.

For instance, Germany, Spain and the Netherlands only have  fatalities in 2019, that is  % of EU fatalities for % of the population in 2017. This means this group of three populated countries performs better than the whole EU.

At the opposite, Poland, Bulgaria and Romania have 5401 fatalities in 2019, that is  % of EU fatalities also, but for only % of the population in 2017.
 
While those six countries together make 48% of EU population and 48% of EU fatalities, rate of fatalities per population is 
 % higher in the second group of three countries than in the better group.

Between both groups, France and Italy together have  fatalities the same year, that is  % of EU fatalities for % of the population in 2017. This makes rate of fatalities per population in this third group is 
 % higher in this third group of countries than in the better group.

Those eight countries together make 77% of EU population and 76% of EU fatalities. The last quarter would group the 19 other EU countries which also have good and poor performers but with a smaller weight in the EU performance.

UK regions

Compared mortality in UK NUTS 1 regions.

Expenditure

In Europe, expenditure for traffic safety is far less than the costs of road traffic injuries.

Miscellaneous

Project EDWARD is the biggest Europe-wide awareness and enforcement campaign on road safety.

The goal of the project European Day Without A Road Death (Project EDWARD) is that nobody dies on the roads of Europe on Wednesday 19 September 2018. In 2018, project EDWARD reached a score of 37.2 million on the Twitter social media.

The fourth edition occurred on 26 September 2019.
That day, 52 people were killed on the European roads, a few less than the daily 70 killed per day. In eleven EU countries, nobody was killed that day.

The keyword used on social media for this campaign is the word #ProjectEDWARD.

Next EDWARD day is planned on 16 September 2020.

On 17 September 2020 was set the roadpol safety day. That day, 34 people dies on the European roads of 26 participating countries out of 27. 16 countries had zero deaths that day, while 10 countries had had at least one death. Spain, Poland and Romania had more than 5.

See also
European Campaign for Safe Road Design
List of countries by traffic-related death rate
Transportation safety in the United States

References 

Road transport in Europe
Infrastructure in Europe
Road safety
Public policy in Europe